This article details the 2007 Super League season results. The season consisted of 27 rounds as well as a play-off finals series after the end of regular rounds. In all, 168 matches were played by twelve teams, covering nine months from February to October.

Regular season

All teams played in 27 regular rounds. Each team was played at least twice, once home and once away, in addition to a Millennium Magic fixture. Four fixtures were arranged according to the teams' league position at the end of the 2006 season.

Round 1

Round 2

Round 3

 Huddersfield Giants vs St Helens RLFC played before round 1 to make St Helens available for the 2007 World Club Challenge.

Round 4

Round 5

Round 6

Round 7

Round 8

Round 9

Round 10

Round 11

Round 12

Round 13: Millennium Magic

 This round marked the first ever Super League Magic Weekend. All twelve teams played on 5 and 6 May in three games each day at the Millennium Stadium in Cardiff.
Attendance figures represent how many individual fans entered over the duration of the whole day.

Round 14

Round 15

Round 16

Round 17

Round 18

Round 19

Round 20

Round 21

Round 22

Round 23

Round 24

Round 25

Round 26

Round 27

Play-offs

The 2007 Super League championship was decided through a play-off system. The involved teams were set according to their final position in the league tables after all 27 regular rounds. The play-off series had no bearing on the minor premiership (otherwise known as the League Leaders' Shield).

Format

Super League XII gave six places for its play-off finals. It was the sixth successive year the top-six play-off system was used. At the end of the regular season, the table was set:

Note A: Bradford deducted 2 points for salary cap breaches
Note B: Wigan deducted 4 points for salary cap breaches

Home field advantage was given by league position at the end of regular rounds, the lower of the two teams playing at the higher team's ground. The only exception to this rule was the Grand Final, which was held at Old Trafford following tradition. The play-off system followed the double elimination rule for the first and second placed teams, meaning whichever of the teams lost in the qualifying semi-final had to lose again in order to be knocked-out of the tournament entirely.

Bracket

Details

Progression table
 Green cells indicate teams in play-off places at the end of the round. An underlined number indicates the team finished first in the table in that round.
 Note: Table is in round-by-round format, and does not necessarily follow chronological order. Rearranged fixtures are treated as though they were played on their respective rounds' weekends. Rearranged fixtures:
Huddersfield Giants vs St Helens RLFC, Round 3
Hull FC vs Salford City Reds, Round 18

Bradford deducted 2 points, and Wigan deducted 4 points for salary cap breaches.

References

Results